Antônio Luis von Hoonholtz, Baron of Teffé (9 May 1837 – 6 February 1931), was a Brazilian admiral, politician, explorer and geographer.

Biography

He was enrolled at the Naval School on the 25th of January 1852 and became a midshipman in 1854. In December 1858, he was promoted to second lieutenant and professor of the 4th year course at the Naval School. He was a precursor in hydrography and gave his first course in this subject at the Marine Academy of Rio de Janeiro in 1858. He then published the first treatise on hydrography in Portuguese.

During the Paraguayan War, commanding the gunboat , he was one of the heroes of the bombardment of Corrientes, occupied by the defenders of Paraguay. Then, on 11 June 1865, he won the officer's medal of the Imperial Order of the Southern Cross for his actions in the naval battle of the Riachuelo. On 13 and 14 July 1865, in new battles, he managed to set fire to the Paraguyan steamer , which had run aground. On 28 November 1865, he chased the Paraguayan steamer Pira-Guirá, forced it to run aground and seized it.

He then explored the coasts of Brazil in the vicinity of Santa Catarina Island.

In 1871, he was entrusted with the delimitation of the borders between Brazil and Peru: leaving with his colleagues from Rio de Janeiro in October 1871, he travelled up the Amazon to beyond the Pongo de Manseriche, up the Huallaga river to the rapids in the foothills of the Andes, the Rio Negro and the Japurá River to the cataracts, then the Apaporis, the Madeira, the Purus, the Jutaí, the Putumayo and part of the Juruá rivers.

On 17 January 1874, the group entered the course of the Javary River. On 15 March 1874, they found the source and set the boundary marker between Peru and Brazil. He was the only Brazilian to return from this expedition in July 1874. Even his brother Carlos von Hoonholtz who accompanied him died of beriberi. This expedition earned him the title of Baron of Teffé.

He founded the first geographical society in Rio and organised the hydrographic service of his country.

He was also Brazil's minister plenipotentiary in Belgium, Italy and Austria and was elected senator for the state of Amazonas.

Descent
He married Maria Luiza Dodsworth on 28 March 1868. From this marriage 4 children were born:

 Nair de Teffé von Hoonholtz, painter, singer and pianist, having been notably the first female cartoonist in the world. Married to Marshal Hermes da Fonseca, she was First Lady of Brazil from 1913 to 1914.
 Álvaro de Teffé von Hoonholtz, Secretary of the Presidency of the United States of Brazil.
 Oscar de Teffé von Hoonholtz, Brazilian Ambassador.
 Otávio de Teffé von Hoonholtz, writer

His grandson , son of Oscar, became Brazilian ambassador and race car driver. His great-grandson, son of Manuel, was the actor Anthony Steffen (1929–2004).

Works
 Compendio de hydrographia: approvado e adoptado pelo Conselho de Instrucção da Escola de Marinha, com approvação do governo. Rio de Janeiro: Typographia Perseverança, 1864.
 Memórias do Almirante Barão de Teffé a Batalha Naval do Riachuelo: contada à família em carta íntima poucos dias depois d'esse feito pelo 1° Tenente Antônio Luiz von Hoonholtz. Rio de Janeiro: Garnier Irmãos, 1865.
 Arrasamento da laje submarina existente na entrada do Porto de Santos, Província de S. Paulo. Rio de Janeiro: Typographia Nacional, 1877.
 Relatorio dos trabalhos e estudos realizados na Bahia de Antonina. Rio de Janeiro: Typographia Nacional, 1877.
 Província do Paraná: demonstração da superioridade do caminho de ferro de Antonina a Curitiba perante o Instituto Polytechnico Brasileiro. Rio de Janeiro: Tipografia de G. Leuzinger & Filhos, 1879.
 Questão da abertura da Barra de Cabo Frio. Rio de Janeiro: J. De Oliveira, 1881.
 Defeza do Barão de Teffé na questão Cirne Lima. Manaus: Tipografia de Gregorio Joze de Moraes, 1874.
 Em Terra e no Mar. 1912.
 Grande data a comemorar: 24 de julho de 1868. Petrópolis: Vozes, 1921.
 Brasil berço da Sciencia Aeronáutica. London: Mary Frear Keeler, 1924.

Distinctions
  Officer of the Imperial Order of the Cross
  Officer of the Order of the Rose
  Grand Cross of the Imperial Order of St. Benedict of Avis
 Chamberlain to the last empress of Brazil, Teresa Cristina of the Two Sicilies
 Member of the Institut de France
 Honorary member of the Brazilian Historic and Geographic Institute
 Member of the Lisbon Geographic Society
 Corresponding member of the French Academy of Sciences in 1889

Legacy
The Brazilian research ship Barão de Teffé was named after him.

References

1837 births
1931 deaths
Brazilian nobility
People from Amazonas (Brazilian state)
Explorers of Amazonia
Brazilian engineers
Members of the Federal Senate (Brazil)
Knights Grand Cross of the Order of Isabella the Catholic
Brazilian military personnel of the Paraguayan War